Notable alumni, faculty and administrators of Utrecht University.

Nobel Prize Laureate Alumni
 Christiaan Eijkman, physician, pathologist
 Nicolaas Bloembergen, physicist
 Peter Debye, physicist
 Willem Einthoven, physician, physicist
 J. H. van 't Hoff, chemist
 Gerardus 't Hooft, physicist
 Tjalling Koopmans, mathematician, physicist, economist
 Wilhelm Röntgen, physicist
 Lavoslav Ruzicka, chemist
 Martinus J.G. Veltman, physicist

Alumni
 Annemarie, Duchess of Parma, journalist, consultant, and member of the extended Dutch Royal Family
 Arend Jan Boekestijn, historian, politician
 Arie A. Kruithof, physicist
 Aristid Lindenmayer, biologist
 Anna Maria van Schurman, classicist and painter
 Abraham Pais, physicist, science historian
 Clarence Barlow, composer
 C.H.D. Buys Ballot, meteorologist
 Elisabeth Bik, microbiologist and science writer 
 Debby Bogaert, professor of pediatrics
 Els Borst, former Dutch minister of Health
 Johannes Martin Bijvoet, chemist
 Lulzim Basha, Mayor of Tirana, politician, former Albanian minister 
 Henk J. M. Bos, historian of mathematics
 James Boswell, author, lawyer
 Rutger Bregman (born 1988), historian
 Peter Braam, computer scientist, mathematician and entrepreneur 
 Pieter Burmann the Younger, philologist
 David Dalrymple, Lord Hailes, author, lawyer
 René Descartes, philosopher, mathematician
 Michael Clyne, linguist
 Johann Georg Graevius, scholar
 Louis Grondijs, Byzantologist, war correspondent
 Jacoba Hol, physical geographer
 Jacob Emil van Hoogstraten, Director Department of Economic Affairs in colonial Indonesia
 J. G. ten Houten, phytopathologist and botanist
 Jacobus Kapteyn, astronomer
 Izaak Maurits Kolthoff, chemist
Philip G. Kreyenbroek, iranist
 Jan van Leeuwen, computer scientist
 Jack van Lint, mathematician
 John Henry Livingston, academic, fourth president of Rutgers University
 Renate Loll, physicist
 Rudolf Magnus, pharmacologist and physiologist
 Maung Maung, 7th President of Burma
 Cecilia Medina, jurist, lawyer
 Erik Meijer, computer scientist
 Marcel Minnaert, astronomer
 Heiko Oberman, historian
 Mark Overmars, computer scientist
 Perizonius, scholar
 Maarten van Rossem, historian
 Johann Jakob Scheuchzer, physician, scientist
 Marie Beatrice Schol-Schwarz, phytopathologist
 Jan Hendrik Scholten, theologian
 Jansje Gretha Schuiringa, one of first Dutch dentists, professor of prosthetic dentistry
 Boudewijn Sirks, specialist in Roman law
 J. Slauerhoff, poet; novelist; assistant at the University's clinic for Dermatology and Venereal Diseases 1929–1930
 Charles Spencer, 3rd Earl of Sunderland, politician
 Jan Jakob Lodewijk ten Kate, poet
 Jan Terlouw, politician, novelist
 Gerard Verschuuren, from the former Institute of Human Biology
 Frans de Waal, zoologist and ethologist
 Hugh Williamson, politician
 Jan Pol, from The Incredible Dr. Pol a Nat Geo Wild reality show, Veterinarian
 Wim Aantjes, politician
 Willem Marcus van Weede, law
Anne Wyllie, scientist

Faculty
Mario Alinei
Cornelis Dirk Andriesse
Frans Andriessen
Barnita Bagchi
Julia Bailey-Serres
Mieke Bal
Marc Baldus
 Johann Conrad Barchusen, first chemistry professor
Nicolaas Beets
Reinout Willem van Bemmelen
Jan Hendrik van den Berg
Jan Bergstra
Frits Beukers
Johannes Martin Bijvoet
Friedrich Wilhelm von Bissing
Fred van der Blij
Pieter Boddaert
Hans L. Bodlaender
Els Borst
Henk J. M. Bos
Onno J. Boxma
Rosi Braidotti
Sjaak Brinkkemper
Marcel Van den Broecke
Hendrik Brugmans
Martin van Bruinessen
C. H. D. Buys Ballot
Hans Clevers
Heinrich von Cocceji
Floris Cohen
Wim Cohen
Jacqueline Cramer
Paul J. Crutzen
Dirk van Dalen
Gerrit De Geest
Peter Debye
Cees Dekker
Dennis Dieks
Isbrand van Diemerbroeck
Jurriaan ten Doesschate
Franciscus Donders
Hans Duistermaat
Carl Andreas Duker
Thomas von der Dunk
Cornelis van Eck
Christiaan Eijkman
Peter Ester
Daan Frenkel
Hans Freudenthal
Bas de Gaay Fortman
Robert van Genechten
Johann Georg Graevius
Louis Grondijs
Piet Gros
Hendrik Jacob Hamaker
A. G. van Hamel
Sadik Harchaoui
Pieter Harting
Majid Hassanizadeh
Michiel Hazewinkel
Albert J.R. Heck
William S. Heckscher
Karl Heilbronner
Philip Willem van Heusde
Jacob van der Hoeden
Martin Hoek
Jacobus Henricus van 't Hoff
Jan Hogendijk
Paulien Hogeweg
Jacoba Hol
Gerard 't Hooft
Johannes Hoornbeek
Pieter Willem van der Horst
Ambrosius Hubrecht
Johannes Alphonsus Huisman
John Huizinga
G.P. van Itterzon
Cornelis de Jager
Mark Janse
Hans Jansen
Nico van Kampen
Paul Joan George Kapteyn
Gustav Heinrich Ralph von Koenigswald
Ilse Kokula
Jan Koster
Jan Lambooy
Jan van Leeuwen
Jan Christiaan Lindeman
Rudolf Magnus
Rob Meens, medieval historian
Lambert Meertens
Annette Merz
Marcel Minnaert
Ieke Moerdijk
Bert Mosselmans
Pieter van Musschenbroek
Frits van Oostrom
Cornelis Willem Opzoomer
Leonard Ornstein
Ab Osterhaus
Jean Abraham Chrétien Oudemans
Mark Overmars, computer scientist
Jean Henri Pareau
Adriaan Theodoor Peperzak
Petrus van Mastricht
Herman Philipse
Pieter Hendrik van Cittert
Cornelis Pijnacker Hordijk
Ronald Plasterk
Sacha Prechal
August Adriaan Pulle
Jan de Quay
Henricus Regius
Henricus Reneri
Maarten van Rossem
Job de Ruiter
Leopold Ružička
Heleen Sancisi Weerdenburg
Willem Saris
Mirko Tobias Schäfer
Hans Schenk
Paul Schnabel
Peter Schrijver
Wisse Alfred Pierre Smit
Hermann Snellen
Sami Solanki
T. A. Springer
Hendricus Stoof
Dirk Jan Struik
Karel van der Toorn
Uğur Ümit Üngör
William Uricchio
Peter van der Veer
Jan G.F. Veldhuis
Martinus J. G. Veltman
Co Verdaas
Pieter verLoren van Themaat
Willem Anton van Vloten
Johannes Voet
Gisbertus Voetius
Henk van der Vorst
Petrus Johannes Waardenburg
Willem Albert Wagenaar
Stefan E. Warschawski
C. E. A. Wichmann
David de Wied
Bernard de Wit
Hermann Witsius
George Weijer

Rectors
(Dates as rectors)
Jan Ackersdijck 1840 to 1841 
Antonius Aemilius 1644 to 1645, and 1659 to 1660
Christian Bernhard Albinus 1728 to 1729, and 1741 to 1742 
Hieronymus Simons van Alphen 1717 to 1718, and 1733 to 1734 
Henricus Johannes Arntzenius 1793 to 1794 
Hermann Arntzenius 1803 to 1804, and 1820 to 1821 
Johan d’Aulnis de Bourouill 1888 to 1889 
Johannes Marinus Simon Baljon 1904 to 1905
Nicolaas Beets 1877 to 1878
Daniel Berckringer 1648 to 1649
Cornelis Adriaan Bergsma 1843 to 1844
Jan Bleuland 1799 to 1800, and 1816 to 1817
Hendrik Bolkestein 1934 to 1935
Peter Bondam 1776 to 1777, and 1788 to 1789
Gisbert Bonnet 1764 to 1765, 1779 to 1780, and 1792 to 1793
Hermannus Bouman 1829 to 1830, and 1844-1845
Willem Gerard Brill 1871 to 1872
Arnoldus Johannes Petrus van den Broek 1923 to 1924
William Laurence Brown 1789 to 1790 
Jan Richard de Brueys 1825 to 1826
Johannes de Bruin 1663 to 1664, and 1672 to 1674
Frans Burman (theologian, born 1628) 1664 to 1665, and 1670 to 1671
Frans Burman (theologian, born 1671) 1718 to 1719
Frans Burman (theologian, born 1708) 1746 to 1747, 1766 to 1767, and 1782 to 1783 
Pieter Burman the Elder 1703 to 1704, and 1711 to 1712 
Christophorus Henricus Didericus Buys Ballot 1863 to 1864
Giovanni Salvemini (Johann Castillon) 1758 to 1759
Ernst Julius Cohen 1915 to 1916
Jacob Cramer (theologian) 1892 to 1893
Hendrik Cornelis Dibbits 1894 to 1895 
Bernardus Schotanus 1635 to 1641

Notes and references
	

Utrecht University